The Södermanland Runic Inscription 47  is a Viking Age runestone engraved in Old Norse with the Younger Futhark runic alphabet. It is located in Vålsta in Nyköping Municipality. The inscription consists of both long branch runes and cipher runes ("branch" and "ice" types).

Inscription
Transliteration of the runes into Latin characters

 ...(ʀ)-kʀ : kiarþi : kuml : þat:si : eftiʀ : osmunt : sun : sin + han : is : krafin : o · ku... <rauʀ> : <uart/fart> : at : ryʀ:iks : sun
Old Norse transcription:

 

English translation:

 "Hrœríkr made this monument in memory of Ásmundr, his son. He is buried in Gotland/ the monument(?) ... cairn(?) in memory of Hrœríkr's son. "

References

Runestones in Södermanland